Wu-Yao Shengxuan (born 7 November 1998) is a Chinese footballer currently playing as a goalkeeper for Shanghai Mitsubishi .

Club career
Wu-Yao Shengxuan would play for the Shijiazhuang Ever Bright youth team before joining second tier Zhejiang Yiteng on 12 July 2018. Initially utilized as a reserve goalkeeper he would unfortunately be part of the squad that was relegated at the end of the 2018 China League One season. After three seasons with the club he would join second tier club Nantong Zhiyun on 6 April 2021. He would be part of the squad that helped the club gain promotion to the top tier at the end of the 2022 China League One season.

Career statistics
.

References

External links

1998 births
Living people
Chinese footballers
Association football goalkeepers
China League Two players
Cangzhou Mighty Lions F.C. players
Nantong Zhiyun F.C. players